Valmy was one of six s (contre-torpilleurs) built for the French Navy during the 1920s.

After France signed an armistice with Germany in June 1940 during World War II, Valmy served with the navy of Vichy France. She was among the ships of the French fleet scuttled at Toulon, France, on 27 November 1942.

Notes

References

 
 

World War II warships scuttled at Toulon
Maritime incidents in November 1942
Guépard-class destroyers
1928 ships
Ships built in France